Die Freiheit ('Freedom') was a daily newspaper published from Berlin between 1918 and 1922 as well as between 1928 and 1931. Die Freiheit was the organ of the Independent Social Democratic Party of Germany (USPD). Among the editor-in-chiefs of the newspaper were Rudolf Hilferding and Wilhelm Dittmann.

References

1918 establishments in Germany
1922 disestablishments in Germany
1928 establishments in Germany
1931 disestablishments in Germany
Daily newspapers published in Germany
Defunct newspapers published in Germany
German-language newspapers
Newspapers published in Berlin
Publications established in 1918
Publications disestablished in 1922
Publications established in 1928
Publications disestablished in 1931
Socialist newspapers